Malcolm Jaleel "M. J." Rhett (born November 15, 1992) is an American professional basketball player.

Professional career
He has played, in the course of his professional career, in Latvia, the Philippines, the Dominican Republic, Lebanon, France, Brazil, Croatia, and Greece.

Rhett signed with GTK Gliwice of the PLK on July 17, 2020.

On December 2, 2020, he has signed with MKS Dąbrowa Górnicza of the Polish Basketball League (PLK).

On March 30, 2021, he has signed with Boulazac of the LNB Pro A.

On August 27, 2022, he has signed with Wilki Morskie Szczecin of the Polish Basketball League (PLK).

References

External links
Ole Miss bio

1992 births
Living people
American expatriate basketball people in Croatia
American expatriate basketball people in Latvia
American expatriate basketball people in the Philippines
American men's basketball players
Basketball players from South Carolina
Blackwater Bossing players
Boulazac Basket Dordogne players
Centers (basketball)
Dominican Republic men's basketball players
Flamengo basketball players
KK Cibona players
Novo Basquete Brasil players
Ole Miss Rebels men's basketball players
P.A.O.K. BC players
Philippine Basketball Association imports
Power forwards (basketball)
Tennessee State Tigers basketball players